The 2019 Baltic Open was a professional tennis tournament played on clay courts. It was the 1st edition of the Baltic Open as part of the WTA International tournaments of the 2019 WTA Tour. It took place at the National Tennis Centre Lielupe in Jūrmala, Latvia, from 22 to 28 July 2019.

This tournament replaced the Moscow River Cup on the WTA Tour.

Points and prize money

Point distribution

Prize money

Singles main draw entrants

Seeds

 Rankings as of July 15, 2019.

Other entrants
The following players received wildcards into the singles main draw:
  Jana Fett
  Diāna Marcinkēviča
  Kamilla Rakhimova

The following player received entry using a protected ranking into the main draw:
  Patricia Maria Țig

The following players received entry from the qualifying draw:
  Başak Eraydın 
  Barbara Haas
  Valentina Ivakhnenko 
  Katarzyna Kawa 
  Paula Ormaechea 
  Nina Stojanović

Withdrawals
Before the tournament
  Vitalia Diatchenko → replaced by  Chloé Paquet
  Ivana Jorović → replaced by  Han Xinyun
  Kaia Kanepi → replaced by  Anhelina Kalinina
  Daria Kasatkina → replaced by  Varvara Flink
  Veronika Kudermetova → replaced by  Kristína Kučová
  Kateryna Kozlova → replaced by  Patricia Maria Țig
  Vera Lapko → replaced by  Elena Rybakina
  Yulia Putintseva → replaced by  Ana Bogdan
  Evgeniya Rodina → replaced by  Kristýna Plíšková
  Alison Van Uytvanck → replaced by  Ysaline Bonaventure

Retirements
  Margarita Gasparyan
  Kristína Kučová

Doubles main draw entrants

Seeds

1 Rankings as of July 15, 2019

Other entrants 
The following pairs received wildcards into the doubles main draw:
  Ksenia Aleshina /  Kamilla Bartone 
  Veronika Pepelyaeva /  Anastasia Tikhonova

Champions

Singles

  Anastasija Sevastova def.  Katarzyna Kawa, 3–6, 7–5, 6–4

Doubles

  Sharon Fichman /  Nina Stojanović def.  Jeļena Ostapenko /  Galina Voskoboeva, 2–6, 7–6(7–1), [10–6]

References

External links
Official website

2019 in Latvian sport
2019 WTA Tour
July 2019 sports events in Europe
2019